Dan Mayo (born 1 July 1990) is an Israeli drummer, composer, and educator, best known as the drummer of TATRAN, a power trio with Tamuz Dekel on guitar and Offir Benjaminov on bass.

Biography
Mayo began playing the drums at the age of 3, participating in musical events at school from the age of 6, while developing skills on the piano, saxophone, and marimba. He dropped out of high school in order to focus on his drumming and music, and went to study at a music academy, from which he also eventually dropped out.  He began creating spiritual, avant-garde music.

Apart from playing with his band TATRAN, Mayo also tours with Ester Rada. He has performed all over the world at events such as the Montreal Jazz Festival, Atlanta Jazz Festival, Vancouver Jazz Festival, State-X New Forms, Oppikoppi Festival, Rochester Jazz Festival, Ottawa Jazz Festival, and more.

Discography

Solo
Studio albums
 Big Brown Eyes (2019)

Live albums
 Woodhouse (2020)

With CRuNCH 22
 CRuNCH 22 (2013)
 Alice's Adventures in Wonderland (2016)
 Lush Flush (2018)

With Ester Rada
 Ester Rada (2014)
 I Wish (2015)
 Different Eyes (2017)

With Tatran
Studio albums
 Shvat (2014)
 Foresee (2018)

EPs
 No Sides (2017)

Live albums
 Soul Ghosts (2015)
 Border View (2020)
 Merchant House (2020)
 On Hold with Eden Ladin (2020)
 Two Days with Eyal Talmudi (2020)

With dema
 love (2016)

With Yehezkel Raz
 Zu (2018)
 Before (2020)
 Session 1 (2020)
 Tree (2020)

References

External links
 

1990 births
Living people
Israeli jazz musicians
Avant-garde jazz drummers
21st-century drummers